The inauguration of Andrew Johnson as the 17th president of the United States was held on April 15, 1865, at Kirkwood House in Washington, D.C., following the assassination of President Abraham Lincoln. The inauguration marked the commencement of Andrew Johnson's only term (a partial term of ) as president. Chief Justice Salmon P. Chase administered the presidential oath of office. This was the third non-scheduled, extraordinary inauguration to take place. After the ceremony, President Johnson gave an impromptu inaugural address, which began with him begging the cabinet to remain with him and then attacking the Confederate States of America with such venom, that one witness remarked "It would have been better had he been struck dumb."

As President Lincoln lay dying, Vice President Johnson visited the room where he lay. When Mrs. Lincoln saw him, she reportedly screamed and demanded he be removed, so he went back to his room at Kirkwood House.

According to newspaper reports, Johnson had gotten severely inebriated, and when aides to the now-dead Lincoln came to fetch the new president they were unable to wake him for several minutes. When he was finally awake, the accounts read, "he had puffy eyes and his hair was caked with mud from the street," and that a barber and doctor were summoned to clean him up for the ten-o'clock ceremony, which most accounts agree went smoothly. However, there are other accounts, believed more reliable by some, which refute this claim.

See also
Presidency of Andrew Johnson
Reconstruction era

References

United States presidential inaugurations
1865 in American politics
Inauguration
Inauguration of Andrew Johnson
1865 in Washington, D.C.
April 1865 events